Kemsley railway station is on the Sheerness Line in north Kent, England, and serves the village of Kemsley. Train services are provided by Southeastern.

History
The station was opened by the Southern Railway as Kemsley Halt on 1 January 1927. It was renamed to Kemsley by British Rail on 5 May 1969.

Facilities
There are two platforms but no station building at this unstaffed location. Access between the two platforms is via a footbridge or the road bridge (for step-free access) to the north of the station. Services towards Swale, Queenborough and Sheerness-on-Sea depart from platform 1.

Services

All services at Kemsley are operated by Southeastern using  EMUs.

The typical off-peak service in trains per hour is:
 1 tph to 
 1 tph to 

During the peak hours, the service is increased to 2 tph.

References

External links

Railway stations in Swale
DfT Category F2 stations
Former Southern Railway (UK) stations
Railway stations in Great Britain opened in 1927
Railway stations served by Southeastern